Võ Văn Kiệt (23 November 1922 – 11 June 2008) was a Vietnamese politician and economic reformer who served as the Prime Minister of Vietnam from 1991 to 1997. A well regarded Vietnamese revolutionary and political leader, Kiệt was a veteran fighter in the long wars against the French colonialists and then the South Vietnamese and American forces during the Vietnam War. In the difficult post-war years, he was one of the most prominent reformist leaders that led the Đổi mới (lit: Innovation) policy in Vietnam since 1986. His premiership (1991–1997) saw the country's return to the world arena after decades of war and isolation.

Background
Võ Văn Kiệt was born Phan Văn Hòa in 1922 into a peasant family in Trung Hiệp village, Vũng Liêm, Vĩnh Long province in the Mekong Delta in southern Vietnam, then a part of Cochinchina in what was called French Indochina. His birth name was Phan Văn Hòa and he changed it to Võ Văn Kiệt when he was admitted to the Indochinese Communist Party in 1939. He also had a pseudonym, Sáu Dân.  He joined the Anti-imperialist Youth Movement and took part in the Nam Kỳ (Cochinchina) insurrection in Vũng Liêm district.

Political career

Võ Văn Kiệt was a member of the  Viet Minh independence movement, he fought against the French colonial powers in the First Indochina War (1946–54) in Southern Vietnam. According to Geneva Accords, communist cadres were forced to gather in  North Vietnam, but he was among those who remained in the South, moving between secret bases in the southeastern region. His first wife, Trần Kim Anh, and his two children were killed in a rocket attack by US forces in 1966.

In 1960, he was elected alternate member of the Communist Party Central Committee and a member of COSVN in 1961, in command of communist forces in Saigon and surrounding areas. After North Vietnamese forces took control of Saigon on April 30, 1975, he led the takeover of the city and in 1976 was appointed as Chairman of the People's Committee (alias governor) as well deputy party secretary of the city, which had been renamed to Ho Chi Minh City in memory of the deceased leader.

In the early postwar years, South Vietnam's economy deteriorated rapidly due to the withdrawal of US investment and the harsh Stalinist policies enforced by central government. Saigon, formerly a dynamic economic center, faced for the first time a widespread lack of food and other commodities. As the head of the city government, Võ Văn Kiệt realized that the Soviet economic model was flawed and secretly promoted trade and manufacturing behind the state's back. Gradually he became one of the staunchest supporters of the reformist faction in the party, many of whom were local party heads and administrators in southern provinces.

In 1982, he was promoted to Deputy chairman of the Council of Ministers (Vice Premier) and became Chairman of the State Planning Commission. In 1987, he was appointed First Deputy Prime Minister of Vietnam and assumed the role of Acting Prime Minister from March to June 1988 after the sudden death of Phạm Hùng. In the tradition of the party's organisation, he should have been made Premier. However, allegedly due to a personal quarrel between Võ Văn Kiệt and Nguyễn Văn Linh- the Secretary General and his longtime superior - as well as opposition from conservative members of the Politburo, Đỗ Mười was chosen instead. In the plenary session of the National Assembly in 1988, however, many delegates nominated him as a second candidate. Even though he got only 35% of votes, this was unprecedented, as elections in the National Assembly had previously had one candidats and they were essentially just a rubber-stamp of decisions made by the Party Politburo.

Võ Văn Kiệt took the role of First Vice Premier and continued to push his reform agenda. In 1991, he was elected as Prime Minister, an office he held until 1997. His tenure marked the advance of the administrative branch at the expense of the influence of the Party's institutions, when the power was shared by three top leaders: himself as Prime Minister, General Secretary Đỗ Mười), and President Lê Đức Anh. He initiated a large program of economic reform, reorganised the government and urged the broadening of diplomatic ties. In the early 1990s Vietnam gradually recovered from the economic crisis of the previous decade. In 1995 the country joined the ASEAN community and normalized relations with the US, ending 20 years of formal mutual enmity and American embargo after the fall of Saigon.

The conflict between reformist and conservative factions increased and culminated in a series of power struggles in the mid-1990s. Representing the reformists, Võ Văn Kiệt advocated for further privatisation of the state dominated economy, as well as democratization - an approach criticised by his political rivals as dangerous to "socialist orientation". In 1996, after the party could not create a consensus on personnel arrangement, all of the three top leaders remained in their positions. However, factionalism was only intensified and eventually led Võ Văn Kiệt and his opponents Mười and Anh to step down at the same time in 1997. They continued to influence the country affairs as advisors to the Standing Committee of the party until 2001.

Final years, death and funeral
After retiring from politics, Võ Văn Kiệt lived in Ho Chi Minh City. Since then, he had spoken out on many issues, and was seen as a defender of people's rights.

Võ Văn Kiệt was the highest-ranking former government official to have openly spoken out about reconciliation with Vietnamese exiles and democracy activists.  He had spoken out against the proposed expansion of Hanoi and the demolition of the historic National Assembly building in Ba Đình Square to make place for a new one.

Võ Văn Kiệt was admitted to Singapore's Mount Elizabeth Hospital on June 3, 2008 and died at the age of 85 on June 11, 2008.

State media did not announce his death until the night of June 12, after most foreign news agencies had already reported it and many foreign dignitaries had already offered condolences, including United Nations Secretary-General Ban Ki-moon.   The government of Vietnam announced a state funeral on June 14 and 15 to be held in the Reunification Palace (Ho Chi Minh City), Hanoi, and his birth province Vĩnh Long.

Memorial and burial services at state level for Võ Văn Kiệt were organized in Vietnam's southern Hồ Chí Minh City on Sunday morning June 15, 2008 with the participation of many residents and officials, including the country's top party and state leaders. Thousands of mourners lined the streets of Hồ Chí Minh City for the funeral of Võ Văn Kiệt.

"The death of former prime minister Võ Văn Kiệt is a great loss to the party, state, people and his family... He had a spirit of daring to think and daring to do. The comrade (Võ Văn Kiệt) and party and state leaders led all people to conduct the renovation cause, bringing our country out of the socioeconomic crisis," Nông Đức Mạnh, General Secretary of the Communist Party of Vietnam Central Committee and head of the funeral board, said at the memorial service televised live by the Central Vietnam Television.

Top Communist Party officials, some wearing black suits and black ties, solemnly stood to attention in the front row of mourners before Võ Văn Kiệt's coffin during the service. Relatives stood in black mourning clothes and white headbands.

The coffin was draped in Vietnam's red flag with a gold star and enclosed in a glass case for transportation on a gun carriage through city streets to the national cemetery for burial.

Tens of thousands of mourners lined the streets to honor Võ Văn Kiệt as his coffin was carried in a procession of military vehicles through Hồ Chí Minh City to be cremated.

The country's political elite paid their respects in Reunification Palace, where Communist Party chief Nông Đức Mạnh headed long lines of mourners who filed past Võ Văn Kiệt's coffin from early Saturday.

As his body lay in state, the palace hall was filled with incense smoke and funereal music played by an army band. Saturday and Sunday were declared days of mourning with flags flying at half-mast at official buildings.

In a statement, current Prime Minister Nguyễn Tấn Dũng paid tribute to Võ Văn Kiệt as "a wholehearted, loyal, irrepressible and heroic revolutionary. All his life, all his heart and all his force was for the country and the people."

Deputy Prime Minister and Foreign Minister Phạm Gia Khiêm told AFP that Võ Văn Kiệt "was very dynamic in setting policy in the renovation period, and I think his contribution will stay with the Vietnamese people forever."

Eulogy
The eulogy for Võ Văn Kiệt was given by communist party leader Nông Đức Mạnh at the Reunification Palace in Hồ Chí Minh City, where his body had been lying in state.

He described Võ Văn Kiệt as "an excellent leader of our party, state and people, a faithful revolutionary fighter who has devoted his whole life for national independence, socialism and people's happiness". Võ Văn Kiệt's flag-draped coffin, carried in a glass case and accompanied by a military procession, was then taken through the streets, where thousands of mourners waited to pay tribute. Vietnam held two days of national mourning. Among the grey ranks of Vietnam's communist leadership, Võ Văn Kiệt was one of few figures to have stood out.

Credited as a leading figure in the economic reforms known as Đổi Mới, which have transformed Vietnam's economy, he was a rarity among senior officials in speaking out publicly against the failings of economic system . One of his comrades in arms, Trần Quốc Hương, former head of intelligence for the Việt Cộng network in South Vietnam, wrote in the condolence book: "I was deeply moved by your death. You were my comrade, my friend, and my brother."

After the communist victory in 1975 he became party secretary of Saigon, and quietly defied hard-line official policy by trying to work with officials and businesses associated with the defeated government. As prime minister, Võ Văn Kiệt presided over a period of dramatic economic growth and foreign investment.

In an interview with the BBC in 2007 he questioned whether Communist Party members were true patriots, saying: "The motherland of Vietnam doesn't belong to one person, one party or one group only."

In his final weeks, Võ Văn Kiệt also spoke out against the expansion of the capital Hanoi and expressed concern whether Vietnam could protect itself against rising sea levels caused by global warming.

Legacy
Võ Văn Kiệt led Vietnam's economic reform of the 1990s and its reopening to the outside world after decades of isolation. His death raises questions about which way the communist party in Vietnam would move on. There were signs in late 2010s that Võ Văn Kiệt's reformist allies had been losing their influence.

Out of office, since 1997, Võ Văn Kiệt remained active in politics, publishing commentaries pushing for more liberalisation even as Vietnam joined the World Trade Organization in 2007 and averaged annual GDP growth of 7.5 percent since 2000.

Quotes

References

External links 
 International Herald Tribune: Vo Van Kiet, who led Vietnam to freer markets, dead at 85

1922 births
2008 deaths
People from Vĩnh Long province
2008 in Vietnam
Prime Ministers of Vietnam
Vietnamese Buddhists
Deaths from pneumonia in Singapore
Alternates of the 4th Politburo of the Communist Party of Vietnam
Members of the 5th Politburo of the Communist Party of Vietnam
Members of the 6th Politburo of the Communist Party of Vietnam
Members of the 7th Politburo of the Communist Party of Vietnam
Members of the 8th Politburo of the Communist Party of Vietnam
Members of the Standing Committee of the 8th Politburo of the Communist Party of Vietnam
Alternates of the 3rd Central Committee of the Workers' Party of Vietnam
Members of the 3rd Central Committee of the Workers' Party of Vietnam
Members of the 4th Central Committee of the Communist Party of Vietnam
Members of the 5th Central Committee of the Communist Party of Vietnam
Members of the 6th Central Committee of the Communist Party of Vietnam
Members of the 7th Central Committee of the Communist Party of Vietnam
Members of the 8th Central Committee of the Communist Party of Vietnam
Deputy Prime Ministers of Vietnam
Government ministers of Vietnam
Vietnamese reformers